Nanda Ziegler (born Joelma Fernanda Gomes da Silva on 20 July 1981)  is a Brazilian actress, producer, and fashion model. She has appeared in several Brazilian TV series and films, most notably as Naamá in 2014's in the acclaimed Brazilian series José do Egito (tv series)  and as Bianca Fischer in 2008's  in the acclaimed trilogy Caminhos do Coração, The Mutants: Pathways of the Heart, Mutantes: Promessas de Amor.

Early life
Nanda Ziegler was born in Juiz de Fora, a city in Minas Gerais, Brazil. Her exposure to the world of acting came at a very early age when she fell in love with the art of interpretation while reading plays in school. As a teenager, Nanda started to seriously pursue roles in television and films.
Today, Nanda continues to build upon a versatile career in film, television and on stage.
She is the youngest of four daughters to Maria Aparecida Selma and Carlos Alberto Gomes. The actress adopted the surname Ziegler from her paternal grandmother.
Nanda is married to Alexandre Avancini. And together have a son named Enrico.
Nanda is fluent in Portuguese, Spanish and English.

Career
Nanda Ziegler debuted with characters of great success in Brazilian soap operas. In 2005 debuted in "Prova de Amor", where her played the prostitute Gigi. This novel that leveraged the audience the channel Rede Record. In 2007 came to prominence with the reporter Latífe, of the Center for investigative journalism "Vidas Opostas". Most of the scenes were shot in Tavares Bastos favela (slum). Also in 2007 she was invited to play the vampire as Bianca Fischer in the trilogy: Caminhos do Coração, The Mutants: Pathways of the Heart, "Mutantes: Promessas de Amor" Due to the huge success the trilogy lasted the years 2007 to 2009. In 2011 Nanda Ziegler gave life to as Helena, villain in the "Rebelde (telenovela brasileira)", produced by the channel Rede Record along the Grupo Televisa. In 2012 Nanda produced and wrote the short film "Passagem do Tempo", with scenes shot in Los Angeles, CA. In 2013 Nanda indulges the character Naamá, in the biblical story of "José do Egito (minissérie)". In the United States the miniseries aired in Spanish on channel MundoFox. The miniseries had scenes shot in Atacama Desert, Egypt, Israel and the studios of Rede Record''. In 2013 Nanda interprets the stripper Xuxu, in "Pecado Mortal". As early as 2014 Nanda serves on the feature film "O Tempo Feliz Que Passou" written and directed by André da Costa Pinto.

Filmography

References

External links

 

1981 births
20th-century Brazilian actresses
21st-century Brazilian actresses
Brazilian expatriates in the United States
Brazilian film actresses
Living people
People from Juiz de Fora